Bayya is an Indian surname. Notable people with the surname include:

 Bayya Suryanarayana Murthy (1906–1979), parliamentarian
 Bayya Narasimheswara Sarma (1867–1932), Indian independence activist
 Bayya Yegnanarayana, Indian engineer

Indian surnames

Bayya - බයියා is a noun used to represent peoples from rural village which they have significant difference in behaviors compared to people near by high residential cities in the country. These guys are more caring of the nationality, great followers of particular person or a political party. KNOWS AS PREM KUMAR YADAV